Wishon is a former settlement in Madera County, California. It has been inundated by Bass Lake.

References

Former settlements in Madera County, California
Former populated places in California
Destroyed towns
Submerged settlements in the United States